Luigi Bazzani, also called Il Bazzanetto, was an Italian painter, illustrator, and watercolorist.  He was born November 8, 1836, in Bologna, Italy.  Bazzani studied at Bologna's Accademia di Belle Arti then traveled to France, Germany and, eventually, Rome where he settled down in 1861 and began to specialize in genre and landscape subjects as well as set designs for theaters.  Many of his paintings featured the remains of the city's monuments from classical antiquity.

Documentation of Pompeii excavations

Inspired by the rediscovery of Pompeii in 1748, he spent 35 years of his life from approximately 1880 to 1915 documenting the ruins of the ancient city that had been exposed by ongoing excavations with watercolor paintings. Bazzani experimented with the techniques of architectural relief, an aspect so far little known but of great interest for archaeological research and his attention to detail was prized by scientists working at the site. His often exquisitely muted colors and his superb technical skill enabled him to replicate antique stone, whether chipped facing or other decaying aspects of it. At the time of Bazzani's work in Pompeii, the freshly excavated remains were still vibrant with original paint.

He contributed a series of fourteen illustrations to a publication by Pompeii's leading archaeologist Amedeo Maiuri. Since then, however, many interiors have been lost to deterioration. So his work has been a valuable resource for modern archaeologists and scholars as well.

Exhibitions

Beginning in 1895, Bazzani exhibited regularly in Rome, Vienna, Munich, Berlin, and Paris. He also taught perspective and set design at the Academia di Belle Arti in Rome from 1892 to 1896 with Ludovico Zeit and had prize-winning artist Luigi Savoldi as a pupil.  Eventually, Bazzani became a member of academies in Rome, Bologna, and Perugia.  In 2013, the exhibition "Really! The Pompeii of the late 1800s in the painting of Luigi Bazzani" was presented by The Fondazione del Monte di Bologna, in collaboration with the University of Bologna (Department of History, Civilization Cultures, Section of Archeology).  It included a multimedia application developed by the Italian consortium of universities and research centers known as Cineca that integrated images of Bazzani's watercolors into their appropriate locations in Pompeii's archaeological structures as viewed through Google Earth.

Gallery

Pompeii watercolors (See more by clicking on the Wikimedia Commons link)

Rome's monuments

Neoclassical genre paintings

Death

Luigi Bazzani died on February 2, 1927, in Rome, Italy.

References

19th-century Italian painters
19th-century Italian male artists
1836 births
1927 deaths
Neo-Pompeian painters
20th-century Italian painters
20th-century Italian male artists
Academic art
Italian male painters